The Bergantes is a short river in the Valencian and Aragon Communities which rises in the comarca of el Ports (Castellón),  SSE of Morella. It is the only river in Valencia which forms part of the Ebro basin.

Geography
Although its course is not long (approximately ) and it has a relatively small basin, it has a strong flow during the winter, due to heavy rainfall in the headwater area, situated in the shadow of the mountainous area to the north. The river Cantavieja and the river Calders, which rise in Teruel province, join the Bergantes at the pueblo of Forcall. The Bergantes joins the Guadalope just before the reservoir at Calanda.

Ecology
The river has a diverse flora and fauna, including trout, crayfish and otters.

See also
List of rivers of Spain

References

Rivers of Spain
Maestrazgo
Geography of the Province of Castellón
Rivers of the Valencian Community
Ebro basin